Hayden Stanton (13 September 1898 – 7 December 1960) was a Progressive Conservative party member of the House of Commons of Canada. He was born in South Crosby Twp. and became a dairy farmer by career.

He was first elected at the Leeds riding in the 1953 general election and re-elected for successive terms in the 1957 and 1958 elections.

Stanton died in Kingston, Ontario on 7 December 1960 where he was in hospital following stomach surgery, during his term in the 24th Canadian Parliament. John Matheson of the Liberal party succeeded him at Leeds in a May 1961 by-election.

References

External links
 

1898 births
1960 deaths
Canadian farmers
Members of the House of Commons of Canada from Ontario
Progressive Conservative Party of Canada MPs